Jiří Hudeček (born 19 May 1986) is a former Czech cyclist.

Major results

2011
 1st  Time trial, National Road Championships
 3rd Overall Czech Cycling Tour
 6th Road race, Summer Universiade
 9th Overall Okolo Slovenska
2012
 1st Stage 1 Czech Cycling Tour (TTT)
 4th Overall Szlakiem Grodòw Piastowskich
 7th Overall Istrian Spring Trophy
2013
 2nd Overall Course de la Solidarité Olympique
 3rd Overall Tour of Malopolska
 8th Overall Szlakiem Grodòw Piastowskich
 9th Overall Okolo Slovenska

References

1986 births
Living people
Czech male cyclists
Universiade medalists in cycling
Universiade bronze medalists for the Czech Republic
Medalists at the 2011 Summer Universiade
People from Prague-West District
Sportspeople from the Central Bohemian Region